The Watkin Baronetcy, of Northenden in the County Palatine of Chester (now Cheshire), was a title in the Baronetage of the United Kingdom. It was created on 12 May 1880 for the railway magnate and politician Sir Edward William Watkin. He was succeeded by his son, Alfred Mellor Watkin, the second Baronet, who sat as Liberal Member of Parliament for Great Grimsby. The title became extinct on the second Baronet's death in 1914.

Watkin baronets, of Northenden (1880)
Sir Edward William Watkin, 1st Baronet (1819–1901)
Sir Alfred Mellor Watkin, 2nd Baronet (1846–1914)

References

 

Extinct baronetcies in the Baronetage of the United Kingdom